is a 2003 Japanese film directed by Hideo Onchi.

Awards and nominations
28th Hochi Film Award 
 Won: Best Director - Hideo Onchi

References

2003 films
2000s Japanese-language films
2000s Japanese films